U Know My "P" is the first studio album by Lagos rapper Naeto C, released in 2008. Featured guests include Ikechukwu, Wande Coal and Saro Wiwa.  It was one of the most popular albums in Nigeria in 2008 selling over 1 million copies.

Track listing
 "The Devil Is a Liar" 4:22
 "This Is What I Do" 4:48
 "Kini Big Deal" 4:10
 "Sitting on Top" 1:58
 "U Know My P" Feat. Ikechukwu  3:55
 "Gidi" 4:41
 "Lagos City Husler" 4:05
 "I've Been" 4:02
 "One 4 Me" Feat. Wande Coal 4:28
 "Ashawo" Wande Coal  4:34
 "Ringtone" 4:32
 "E Mara Mma" Feat. Saro Wiwa 4:15
 "Superman" 5:06
 "Facebook" 4:14
 "Bami Lo" Feat. Morell  4:04
 "Don't Judge/Outro" 3:58

References

External links

2008 albums
Naeto C albums
2008 in Nigerian music
Albums produced by Tee-Y Mix